Meant to Be is the 2002 debut studio album from Australian R&B singer Selwyn. It was released in Australia, the United States, and South Africa. The album spawned three top 20 singles on the ARIA charts, those being "Buggin' Me", "Rich Girl", and "Way Love's Supposed to Be".
The album peaked at #9 on the ARIA Albums Chart.

Track listing

Disc 1
All tracks written by Audius Mtawarira and Selwyn Pretorius except where noted.
"Intro"
"Buggin' Me"
"She Said"
"My Thang"
"Way Love's Supposed to Be" (Mtawarira/Pretorius/Paul Begaud)
"Negative Things" (Audius Mtawarira)
"Rich Girl" (Daryl Hall)
"Like This, Like That"
"Take My Time"
"Way You Make Me Feel" (Mtawarira/Pretorius/Begaud)
"AM Call" (Audius Mtawarira)
"Tell Me What You Like / Funky Cold Medina / Thank You"

Disc 2 (Bonus edition)
"Rich Girl" (Rudy Remix)
"Buggin' Me" (Hype Music Extended Mix)
"Way Love's Supposed to Be" (Bsyde West Coast Mix)
"Your Booty Is Buggin' Me" (U.W.M.S.C. Mix)
"Rich Girl" (Anna Nicole Mix)
"Way Love's Supposed to Be" (Isaac James Edit)
"Rich Girl" (K-Warren 12")
"Way Love's Supposed to Be" (By the Way)
Multimedia (3 videos, 4 biographies and "On the Road" home movie)

Weekly charts

Certifications

References

Selwyn (singer) albums
2002 debut albums